Umeå University is a public research university located in Umeå, in the mid-northern region of Sweden. The university was founded in 1965 and is the fifth oldest within Sweden's present borders.

As of 2015, Umeå University has over 36,000 registered students (approximately 16,000 full-time students), including those at the postgraduate and doctoral level. It has more than 4,000 employees, half of which are teachers/researchers, including 310 professors.

Internationally, the university is known for research relating to the genome of the poplar tree and the Norway Spruce, and its highly ranked Institute of (industrial) Design.

Organisation

The highest branch at Umeå University is the University Board of Directors. The board includes eight members (including the board chairman) appointed by the government, the vice-chancellor, three representatives for the teachers, three for other employees, and three for the students.

The University Management consists of the vice-chancellor (rector), pro-vice-chancellor, deputy vice-chancellors, senior advisers and the university director.

The university has four faculties and eight campus schools, more than 20 research centers and 36 departments. Most education and research are located at the main campus and Umeå Arts Campus in Umeå, with additional campuses in the cities of Skellefteå and Örnsköldsvik. The total number of students enlisted to some of the 50 different study programs and 800 separate courses exceeds 34,000.

Faculties
The university today has four faculties, listed below in alphabetic order:
 Faculty of Arts
 Faculty of Medicine
 Faculty of Science and Technology
 Faculty of Social Sciences
The faculties in turn consist of a total of 36 departments, these are:
 Department of Applied Educational Science
 Department of Applied Physics and Electronics
 Department of Biobank Research
 Department of Chemistry
 Department of Clinical Microbiology
 Department of Clinical Sciences
 Department of Community Medicine and Rehabilitation
 Department of Computing Science
 Department of Creative Studies (Teacher Education)
 Department of Culture and Media Studies
 Department of Ecology and Environmental Science
 Department of Education
 Department of Epidemiology and Global Health
 Department of Food, Nutrition and Culinary Science
 Department of Geography
 Department of Historical, Philosophical and Religious Studies
 Department of Informatics
 Department of Integrative Medical Biology (IMB)
 Department of Language Studies
 Department of Law
 Department of Mathematics and Mathematical Statistics
 Department of Medical Biochemistry and Biophysics
 Department of Medical Biosciences
 Department of Molecular Biology
 Department of Nursing
 Department of Odontology
 Department of Physics
 Department of Plant Physiology
 Department of Political Science
 Department of Psychology
 Department of Public Health and Clinical Medicine
 Department of Radiation Sciences
 Department of Science and Mathematics Education
 Department of Social Work
 Department of Sociology
 Department of Surgical and Perioperative Sciences

Schools
Umeå University has eight Campus Schools, listed below in alphabetical order:
 Umeå Institute of Design – a.k.a. UID, opened in 1989 at what later became Umeå Arts Campus, and is designed and equipped solely for the teaching of industrial design. UID offers a Bachelor program, master programmes in Transportation Design, Interaction Design and Advanced Industrial Design, and doctoral studies. The institute is known around the world for its high academic standards. It's the only Swedish school on BusinessWeeks top 60 list of design schools in the world.
 Umeå Institute of Technology – is part of the Faculty of Science and Technology. The institute offers a wide range of study programmes, some of them not to be found in any other part of Sweden. Research in engineering is gradually being expanded. The faculty's traditionally strong position in natural sciences form a base on which new technology research is built. The institute is a member of the CDIO Initiative.
 Umeå School of Architecture – opened autumn 2009, and moved 2010 to new facilities at Umeå Arts Campus. Aims to be an internationally orientated laboratory of sustainable architectural development, pursuing education on different levels as well as research. Umeå has obtained 250 study seats in the 5-year Architectural programme.
 Umeå School of Business and Economics – (a.k.a. USBE) has around 2,000 students. The School offers one Bachelor program, four undergraduate programs (Civilekonomprogram) seven master's degrees programs (included the Erasmus Mundus Master in Strategic Project Management-program), as well as a number of doctoral programs. The International atmosphere is important to the school and it offers one undergraduate program (the International Business program) and all Master's programs and doctoral programs entirely in English.
 Umeå School of Education – a.k.a. USE, was inaugurated in January 2009 to replace the former Faculty of Teacher Education.
 Umeå School of Fine Arts – was started in 1987 in a former factory next to the Umeälven river. Every year 12 new students are accepted to the school. A total of 60 people are studying at the academy, situated at Umeå Arts Campus.
 Umeå School of Sport Sciences – offers higher education to active athletes, but also sports related research in sports medicine and sport psychology.
 Umeå University School of Restaurant and Culinary Arts – started in 1996 with the gastronomy program, but also gives courses in leadership and hospitality management.

University Hospital of Umeå

University Hospital of Umeå, ("Norrlands Universitetssjukhus", "NUS") is the main hospital and research center for medical care and medicine in northern Sweden. In cooperation with the university, it hosts one of seven schools for medicine and dental medicine in Sweden.

Academic profile

Admissions
Prospective Swedish students make their applications to all Swedish universities at the Swedish Council for Higher Education website Antagning.se and international students use its counterpart in English, Universityadmissions.se. Information specific to non EU/EEA students (applications, tuition fees and scholarships) can be found at Studyinsweden.se.

Libraries
Umeå University Library (a.k.a. UB) was established at the time of Umeå University's foundation in 1965, but has origins in from the Scientific Library in Umeå established in 1950 at Umeå City Library. Its main building dates from 1968, but has since been extended and rebuilt, most recently in 2006. There are subsidiary libraries at the Norrland's University Hospital, at the Umeå Arts Campus and in Örnsköldsvik.

Research
Umeå University has research departments and education in a broad range of academic disciplines, with more than thirty university departments conducting most teaching and research. Since the 1990s there are also several research centers, mostly local but some in partnership with other Swedish universities, such as the neighbouring Swedish University of Agricultural Sciences and Luleå University of Technology.

The university is home to more than 2,000 researchers and teachers, many of them with international background. Important research areas include ageing and population studies, infections, and forest research.
 Ageing and population studies have access to the new and unique Linnaeus database, which covers the entire Swedish population between 1960 and 2009. It links information from four existing databases, enabling researchers to find new connections between health, lifestyle and aging. The Demographic Data Base also gives access to extensive databases with population statistics from old Swedish parish records, dating back to the 18th century, and from 2012 a Department of Biobank Research, providing data management for research in large biological sample collections collected since the 1990.
 The infection biology research focuses on microorganisms like bacteria, viruses, fungi and parasites, and their molecular infection mechanisms – microbial pathogenesis and virulence. Umeå Centre for Microbial Research (UCMR), offer a qualified environment for the development of new strategies against infectious diseases. The centre also hosts The Laboratory for Molecular Infection Medicine Sweden (MIMS), which is the Swedish's node in the Nordic EMBL Partnership for Molecular Medicine.
 The forest research includes plant and forest biotechnology within the Umeå Plant Science Centre (UPSC) – a collaborative effort between the Department of Plant Physiology at Umeå University and the Department of Forest Genetics and Plant Physiology at the Swedish University of Agricultural Sciences (SLU), and one of the strongest research environments for basic plant research in Europe, known for its research relating to the genome of the Populus tree and the Norway Spruce. The mapping of the spruce genome, in collaboration with the Swedish SciLifeLab, was the first complete sequencing of a gymnosperm and notable because it is seven times the size of the human genome, with some 20 billion base pairs.

Research centers
Research centers at Umeå University listed in alphabetical order:
Arctic Research Centre at Umeå University (Arcum)
Centre for Biomedical Engineering and Physics (CMTF)
Centre for Demographic and Ageing Research (CEDAR)
Centre for Environmental and Resource Economics (CERE)  
Center for Regional Science at Umeå University (Cerum) 
Centre for Teaching and Learning (UPL) 
Climate Impacts Research Centre (CIRC)
Demographic Data Base (DDB)
Digital Social Research Unit (DIGSUM)
European CBRNE Centre
High Performance Computing Center North (HPC2N) 
Humlab 
Molecular Infection Medicine Sweden (MIMS)
Northern Sweden Soil Remediation Centre
Swedish Center for Digital Innovation (SCDI)
Transportation Research (Trum) 
Umeå Center for Functional Brain Imaging (UFBI) 
Umeå Centre for Gender Studies (UCGS)
Umeå Centre for Global Health Research (CGH)
Umeå Centre for Microbial Research (UCMR)
Umeå Center for Molecular Medicine (UCMM) 
Umeå Marine Sciences Center (UMF) 
Umeå Mathematics Education Research Centre (UMERC)
Umeå Plant Science Center (UPSC) 
Umeå School of Sports Sciences (USSS)
Umeå Transgene Core Facility (UTCF) 
Vaartoe – Centre for Sami Research (Cesam)

Publishing
Practically all research papers produced by the university's researchers and students are to be found in the DiVA (Digital Scientific Archive) database, founded in 2000 (see link below).

Rankings

In the latest (2012) Academic Ranking of World Universities, the university was ranked between places 201–300 of all universities in the world and at the same time by the QS World University Rankings the university was ranked 297th in the world (overall). In the latest (2012/2013) Times Higher Education World University Rankings 2012/2013 Umeå University was ranked between 251 and 275 out of all global universities.

In 2012, the university was ranked 23rd in the world of higher education institutions under the age of 50 years by the British magazine Times Higher Education (THE). In 2013 the university was ranked 1st of Sweden in the International Student Barometer on international student satisfaction by the International Graduate Insight Group. In 2014, the university was ranked 400th in the world for information and Computing Sciences Ranking. At the same time in 2014, the university was ranked between places 101–150 in the world for Life and Agriculture Sciences  and between places 151–200 in the world for Clinical Medicine and Pharmacy

Notable people

Alumni

 Adi Utarini, Indonesian scientist, Nature's 10 : ten people who helped shape science in 2020, Time's The 100 Most Influential People of 2021
 Bertil Andersson, president of Nanyang Technological University (2011–2017)
 Stefan Attefall, politician, Minister for Public Health, Minister for Housing in Sweden (2010–2014)
 Ibrahim Baylan, politician, Minister for Energy in Sweden (2014–)
 Martin Kulldorff, professor of medicine at Harvard Medical School, biostatistician at Brigham and Women's Hospital, member of scientific advisory committees to the Food and Drug Administration and the Centers for Disease Control
 Lars Lagerbäck, football manager (Sweden 2000–2009, Iceland 2011–)
 Åsa Larsson Blind, Swedish-Sámi politician
 Hanna Ljungberg, former football player (Umeå IK and the national team of Sweden)
 Stefan Löfven, politician, Prime Minister of Sweden (2014–2021)
 Annika Norlin, pop artist (also known as Hello Saferide)
 Dan Olweus, psychologist, recognized for research in bullying
 Kay Pollack, film director
 Sverker Sörlin, environmental historian and writer
 Jan Lexell, neurologist and professor in rehabilitation medicine

Faculty

 Emmanuelle Charpentier, microbiologist, geneticist, Nobel laureate
 Mathias Dahlgren, associate Professor with the Umeå University School of Restaurant and Culinary Arts
 Pär Hallström, legal writer and professor emeritus of Law
 Kristo Ivanov Professor emeritus of Informatics (1984–2002)
 Agneta Marell, former Dean at USBE (2004–2007), Deputy vice-chancellor (2010–)
 Astrid Norberg, professor emerita in nursing
 Staffan Normark, former professor of microbiology and infectious disease (1980–1989, 2008–2010)
 Tõnu Puu, Professor emeritus of Economics
 Johan Redström, professor at the Umeå Institute of Design
 Marcus Samuelsson, associate Professor with the Umeå University School of Restaurant and Culinary Arts
 Åke Sellström, chemist, former weapon inspector in Syria
 Mike Stott
 Tor Troéng, former professional mixed martial artist currently fighting as a Middleweight for the Ultimate Fighting Championship
 Gunnar Öquist, former professor of plant physiology (1981–2003, 2010–), permanent secretary of the Royal Swedish Academy of Sciences (2003–2010)

Honorary doctorates

 Bertil Andersson, Chief Executive of the European Science Foundation
 Jan Anderson, plant scientist (1998)
 C. West Churchman, American Philosopher and Systems Scientist
 C. Robert Cloninger, American Psychologist and Geneticist
 Harald zur Hausen, awarded the Nobel Prize in Medicine in 2008
 Christopher Martin Dobson, British Chemist
 Kerstin Ekman, writer
 Christer Fuglesang, first Swedish citizen in space
 Anita Gradin, former Swedish counselor of state
 Tarja Halonen, former president of Finland  
 Lars Heikensten, frm. governor of the central bank of Sweden
 Gudmund Hernes, Norwegian sociologist, former Norwegian minister of education
 Roger Jowell
 Carl Kempe, Swedish businessman
 Roger D. Kornberg, awarded the Nobel Prize in Chemistry in 2006
 Nancy Langston, professor
 Sara Lidman, writer
 John Loughlin, professor of politics
 Denis Mukwege, congolese gynecologist, founder of Panzi Hospital
 Lars Nittve, museum director
 Sverker Olofsson, Swedish TV-personality
 Gösta Skoglund, Swedish politician and one of the founders of the university
 Tedros Adhanom, director-general of the World Health Organization (WHO)
 Tom Traves, president of Dalhousie University
 Margot Wallström, Swedish foreign minister (2014–), former European commissioner
 Hans L. Zetterberg, Swedish sociologist

See also
List of universities in Sweden

References

External links
Umeå University - Official website
DiVA (Digital Scientific Archive) - for Umeå University Publications

 
Universities in Sweden
Educational institutions established in 1965
Buildings and structures in Umeå
1965 establishments in Sweden